Omeprazole/amoxicillin/rifabutin, sold under the brand name Talicia, is a fixed-dose combination medication used for the treatment of Helicobacter pylori infection. It is taken by mouth.

It was approved for medical use in the United States in November 2019.

References

External links 
 
 
 
 
 

Combination drugs
Helicobacter pylori